Nigel Antony David Stokes  (born 21 January 1965) was  British Ambassador to Cuba from 2016 to 2022.

Stokes was educated at Queens' College, Cambridge and University College London (PhD, 1990). After working for Schlumberger and Mars, Incorporated he joined Her Majesty's Diplomatic Service in 1994.  He served in Bangkok, Seoul and Riga before his  appointment as Ambassador to the Socialist Republic of Vietnam in 2010.

Stokes was appointed Officer of the Order of the British Empire (OBE) in the 2022 New Year Honours for services to British foreign policy.

References

1965 births
Living people
20th-century British diplomats
Alumni of Queens' College, Cambridge
Alumni of University College London
Ambassadors of the United Kingdom to Cuba
Ambassadors of the United Kingdom to Vietnam
Lieutenants of the Royal Victorian Order
Members of HM Diplomatic Service
Officers of the Order of the British Empire